The 2008–09 Bobsleigh World Cup was a multi race tournament over a season for bobsleigh. The season started on 24 November 2008 in Winterberg and ended on 14 February 2009 in Park City, Utah. The World Cup was organised by the FIBT who also run world cups and championships in skeleton.

Calendar 
Below is the schedule of the 2008/09 season.

Schedule update
On the 14 November 2008, on FIBT website it was announced that the competition at the bobsleigh track in Cortina d'Ampezzo was cancelled to technical issues and the competition for 5–11 January 2009 was moved to the Königssee track in Germany.

Results

Two-man

Four-man

Two-woman

Standings

Two-man

Four-man

Two-woman

References

External links
FIBT

Bobsleigh World Cup
World Cup
World Cup